Lilli Hornig (née Schwenk, ; March 22, 1921 – November 17, 2017) was a Czech-American scientist who worked on the Manhattan Project, as well as a feminist activist.

Early life
Hornig was born in Ústí nad Labem in 1921 to Erwin Schwenk, an organic chemist, and the former Rascha Shapiro, a pediatrician.

In 1929 her family moved to Berlin. Four years later she and her mother came to the United States, following her father who had moved there to escape the Nazis. As her parents were Jewish, her father was threatened with imprisonment in a concentration camp.

She obtained her BA from Bryn Mawr in 1942 and her Ph.D. from Harvard University in 1950. In 1943 she married Donald Hornig. They had four children.

Career
Hornig went with her husband to Los Alamos where he had obtained a job; after being originally asked to take a typing test, her scientific skills were recognized and she was given a job as a staff scientist for the Manhattan Project, in a group working with plutonium chemistry.

Later it was decided that plutonium chemistry was too dangerous for women, and so she worked in high-explosive lenses instead. While at Los Alamos she signed a petition urging that the first atom bomb be used on an uninhabited island as a demonstration.

Hornig later became a chemistry professor at Brown University, and chairwoman of the chemistry department at Trinity College in Washington, D.C. She was appointed by President Johnson as a member of a mission to the Republic of Korea that began the founding of the Korea Institute for Science and Technology.

A feminist, Hornig was the founding director of HERS (Higher Education Resource Services) under the auspices of the Committee for the Concerns of Women in New England Colleges and Universities first organized by Sheila Tobias. She served on equal opportunity committees for the National Science Foundation, the National Cancer Institute, and the American Association for the Advancement of Science. She was the research chair of the Committee for the Equality of Women at Harvard, and consulted with and participated in many studies of women's science education and careers.

Hornig was a Life Trustee of the Woods Hole Oceanographic Institution and was a trustee of the Wheeler School.

Death
Hornig died on November 17, 2017, in Providence, Rhode Island, aged 96.

Works
 Climbing the Academic Ladder: Doctoral Women Scientists in Academe (1979) 
 
 Women Scientists in Industry and Government: How Much Progress in the 1970s. Washington, D.C., 1980. , 
 Scientific sexism, New York: New York Academy of Sciences, 1979. 

Translations
 From My Life. The Memoirs of Richard Willstätter. New York: W.A. Benjamin, 1965. 

Documentaries
Lilli was interviewed for the documentary The Bomb''.

References

External links
 2011 Video Interview with Lilli Hornig by Cynthia C. Kelly Voices of the Manhattan Project
 Biography by historian from museum in Ústí nad Labem (in Czech)

1921 births
2017 deaths
American chemists
American educators
American feminist writers
American people of Czech-Jewish descent
American women's rights activists
Bryn Mawr College alumni
Deaths from organ failure
Harvard University alumni
Manhattan Project people
Women on the Manhattan Project
Los Alamos National Laboratory personnel
Czechoslovak expatriates in Germany
Czechoslovak emigrants to the United States
People from Ústí nad Labem